United Artists Television (UATV) was an American television production/distribution studio of United Artists Corporation that was formed on New Year's Day (January 1), 1958. The company is remembered for producing series such as This Man Dawson, World of Giants, Stoney Burke, The Outer Limits, Gilligan's Island, My Mother the Car, The Fugitive, The Rat Patrol, thirtysomething, The New Phil Silvers Show, The Patty Duke Show and The Pink Panther Show.  In September 2014, the studio briefly returned to full-time TV production under the new management of United Artists Media Group (UAMG), led in part by husband and wife producers Mark Burnett and Roma Downey.  With its folding back into MGM Television, UATV was temporarily dormant until 2020 when MGM Television was reincorporated.

History 
UATV was formed on New Year's Day (January 1), 1958, with Herb Golden, former vice-president of Banker's Trust, as its president, and Bruce Eells from Television Programs of America as its top operating executive.

In that same year, UATV purchased Associated Artists Productions (AAP), giving access to the pre-1950 Warner Bros.' short subject library and the 231 Popeye cartoon shorts made by Fleischer Studios and Famous Studios for Paramount Pictures between 1933 and 1957. With UATV's purchase, AAP became United Artists Associated (UAA) and became its distribution division.

In 1960, UATV purchased Ziv Television Programs, including the 20% share still held by board chairman Frederick Ziv and his son-in-law and business partner president John L. Sinn, for $20 million. The newly merged production company was renamed Ziv-United Artists.

UATV had never been very successful in the small screen, having placed only two series in prime time, The Troubleshooters on NBC and The Dennis O'Keefe Show on CBS, both of the 1959–1960 season. This negative pattern continued after the merger. Ziv-UA produced a dozen of TV pilots during the first year of operation, but failed to sell any of them, although Aubrey Schenck's Miami Undercover only lasted one season in 1961.

In 1962, the studio phased out Ziv Television Programs and reverted its name to United Artists Television. In that same year, ABC premiered a successful prime time television film show called The ABC Sunday Night Movie in competition to NBC's successful motion picture program Saturday Night at the Movies.  The first season featured releases of many United Artists' films with some episodes containing featurettes promoting the upcoming UA's cinema releases.

UATV had several shows such as Stoney Burke (1962), The Patty Duke Show (1963), The Outer Limits (1963), The Fugitive (1963), Hollywood and the Stars (1963), The Hollywood Palace (1964), and Gilligan's Island (1964). In 1967, UATV was purchased by Transamerica Corporation and, the following year, United Artists Associated was reincorporated as United Artists Television Distribution (UATD). After The Mothers-in-Law was cancelled on NBC in 1969, the studio decided to focus in presenting their movie library on television and rerunning their classics after years of still being unsuccessful in TV production.

In 1981, MGM merged with UA to create MGM/UA Entertainment Co.; as a result, their respective television units combined as well became MGM/UA Entertainment Co. Television or simply MGM/UA Television the following year. The United Artists Television name was eventually phased out around 1983 in favor of the MGM/UA Television banner, although UATV continued itself producing television shows until 1995. In 1985, United Artists Television was returned after Turner bought out MGM, to be headed by John J. McMahon, only to be combined into MGM/UA Television Productions within a year, when Turner sold off MGM/UA.

Return to television 
In September 2014, MGM acquired a 55% controlling interest in One Three Media and Lightworkers Media, both operated by husband/wife Hollywood producers Mark Burnett and Roma Downey (Touched by an Angel fame). The two companies were consolidated into a new film and television company, United Artists Media Group (UAMG). Burnett is UAMG's CEO and Downey is president of Lightworkers Media Hearst Entertainment, an investor in Burnett and Downey's entertainment assets, has also acquired a minority stake in United Artists through this deal. Through this acquisition, UAMG held the production rights to Burnett's reality show franchises The Voice, Survivor, The Apprentice, On the Menu, Shark Tank, Beyond the Tank and Lucha Underground.  When it was folded back into MGM Television, UATV's current incarnation ended.  Although since then, MGM/UA Television was reformed (as of February 2020), most new UATV material is produced either by MGM's digital unit or MGM itself.

Shows

United Artists Television (UATV)

United Artists Media Group (UAMG)

Television specials 
 The Incredible World of James Bond (television special, 1965)
 Welcome to Japan, Mr. Bond (1967, television special) 
 The Pink Panther in: A Pink Christmas (1978, television special)
 James Bond: The First 25 Years (1983, television special)

References 

United Artists
Television production companies of the United States
Former Metro-Goldwyn-Mayer subsidiaries
Entertainment companies based in California
Entertainment companies established in 1958
Mass media companies established in 1958
Mass media companies disestablished in 1981
1958 establishments in California
1981 disestablishments in California
American companies established in 1958